AUSCAR may refer to:

 Australian Seed Conservation and Research, an Australian network of agencies involved in native plant conservation
 Australian Stock Car Auto Racing, an auto racing sanctioning body